Eric Arthur Newsholme (19 May 1935 - 17 March 2011) was a biochemist who specialised in human metabolism. He was a fellow of Merton College, Oxford, from 1973 until his retirement in 1995, and published a number of seminal textbooks and research papers.

Life and career

Newsholme was born in Liverpool on 19 May 1935, and was brought up in the city's West Derby suburb. In 1955 he went up to Magdalene College, Cambridge to read Natural Sciences, and then to study for his PhD in Biochemistry under the supervision of Philip Randle. In 1961 he published his first full paper in the Biochemical Journal (on the regulation of glucose uptake by muscle, co-authored with Philip Randle); this was to be followed by more than 100 papers published in that journal, around 20 of these have gone on to be recognized as seminal papers by the research community.

After completing his doctorate, in 1964 he moved to the University of Oxford as a researcher with Sir Hans Krebs. In 1973 he was made a fellow of Merton College, Oxford, and a lecturer at the Department of Biochemistry, where for the next 22 years he trained PhD students and postdoctoral scientists in research techniques in his laboratory.

Newsholme married Pauline Anderson in 1959; they had a son and two daughters, six grandchildren and two great-grandchildren  He was a lifelong fan of Liverpool Football Club. He took up marathon running in his mid-30s, and successfully completed around 40 marathons.

He died in Torquay, South Devon, on 17 March 2011.

Publications

 Regulation in Metabolism (with C. Start, 1973)
 Biochemistry for the Medical Sciences (with Tony Leech, 1983) - updated as Functional Biochemistry in Health and Disease (with Tony Leech, 2010)
 Keep on Running (with Tony Leech and Glenda Duester, 1994)

References 

1935 births
2011 deaths

Fellows of Merton College, Oxford
British biochemists
Alumni of Magdalene College, Cambridge